Laetisha Scanlan (born 13 April 1990) is an Australian sport shooter. She competed in the women's trap event at the 2014 Commonwealth Games where she won a gold medal, she later went on to win gold in the same event at the 2018 Commonwealth Games in the Gold Coast.

Scanlan competed in the women's trap event and also the team event with James Willett at the 2020 Summer Olympics. She just missed out on securing a first Olympic medal by finishing in fourth place of the women’s trap event. Detailed results.

Laetisha started shooting in 2005 at Frankston Australia Gun Club in Victoria, Australia. She has been a part of the Australian team since 2007 and competed in her first overseas competition that same year, in Nicosia.

She attended secondary school at St Margaret's School, Melbourne and later Haileybury.

References

External links

1990 births
Living people
Australian female sport shooters
Olympic shooters of Australia
Shooters at the 2016 Summer Olympics
Commonwealth Games gold medallists for Australia
Commonwealth Games medallists in shooting
Shooters at the 2014 Commonwealth Games
Shooters at the 2018 Commonwealth Games
Monash University alumni
Shooters at the 2020 Summer Olympics
20th-century Australian women
21st-century Australian women
Medallists at the 2014 Commonwealth Games
Medallists at the 2018 Commonwealth Games